Christina Marie Smith (born August 14, 1975) is an American former professional basketball player who played for the Charlotte Sting of the Women's National Basketball Association (WNBA).

Playing career

University of Arkansas
Smith helped lead the Arkansas Razorbacks to the 1998 NCAA Division I Final Four. She left Arkansas as its ninth all-time leading scorer (1459 points), third all-time in assists (507), and second all-time in steals (239). In the 1994–95 season she led the nation in highest free throw percentage (89.9). She was named to the SEC Academic Honor Roll three times. She was inducted into the University of Arkansas Hall of Honor in 2005, the fifth women's basketball player at the time to receive the honor.

Arkansas statistics

Source

Charlotte Sting
Smith played for the Sting for two years, appearing in 28 total games.

WNBA statistics

Regular season

|-
| style="text-align:left;"|1998
| style="text-align:left;"|Charlotte
| 24 || 18 || 18.7 || .360 || .316 || .850 || 1.4 || 3.0 || 0.4 || 0.0 || 2.0 || 3.7
|-
| style="text-align:left;"|1999
| style="text-align:left;"|Charlotte
| 4 || 0 || 4.8 || .750 || .667 || .833 || 0.3 || 0.3 || 0.3 || 0.0 || 0.3 || 3.3
|-
| style="text-align:left;"|Career
| style="text-align:left;"|2 years, 1 team
| 28 || 18 || 16.7 || .380 || .333 || .846 || 1.3 || 2.6 || 0.4 || 0.0 || 1.8 || 3.6

Playoffs

|-
| style="text-align:left;"|1998
| style="text-align:left;"|Charlotte
| 2 || 0 || 9.5 || .167 || .000 || .250 || 0.5 || 0.5 || 0.0 || 0.0 || 0.0 || 1.5

Coaching career

Smith served as assistant coach of Jefferson High School women's basketball team the year before becoming head coach of William Henry Harrison High School's women's basketball team during their 2007–2008 season. Smith joined the staff of Valparaiso University in August 2008 as an assistant coach. During her tenure she assisted with the team's recruiting.

Smith was an assistant coach at Purdue and helped lead the team to the straight NCAA Tournament second round appearances. During her tenure, the team went 77–27. Smith joined the coaching staff at Arkansas in 2014 as an assistant coach.  She left after two seasons with the Razorbacks.

Smith became the head coach of the Incarnate Word Cardinals women's basketball team in 2016.

Honors and awards

College
Women’s Basketball News Service, 2nd team (1994–95)
WBNS Freshman All-America, 1st team (1994–95)
ESPN Basketball Top 5 (1995–96)
Women’s Basketball News Service, 2nd team preseason All-America (1995–96)
Women’s BB News Service; Athlon Sports, Lindy’s, 2nd team preseason All-American (1996–97)
Women’s Basketball News Service All-American 2nd team (1997–98)
WBNS preseason All-American (1997–98)

Personal life
Smith earned a bachelor's degree in exercise science from University of Arkansas in 1998 and a master's degree in 2001 in biomechanics. She has three children.

References

External links
W. Basketball All-Americans | Arkansas Razorbacks
Women's Basketball – 2010–11 Roster – Official Athletic Site of the Valparaiso University Crusaders
Christy Smith Bio – PURDUESPORTS.COM – Purdue Official Athletic Site

1975 births
Living people
American women's basketball coaches
American women's basketball players
Arkansas Razorbacks women's basketball coaches
Arkansas Razorbacks women's basketball players
Basketball coaches from Indiana
Basketball players from Indiana
Charlotte Sting players
Guards (basketball)
High school basketball coaches in the United States
People from Benton County, Indiana
People from West Lafayette, Indiana
Purdue Boilermakers women's basketball coaches
Universiade gold medalists for the United States
Universiade medalists in basketball
Valparaiso Beacons women's basketball coaches
Medalists at the 1997 Summer Universiade